The twenty-fourth season of The Bachelor premiered on January 6, 2020. This season features 28-year-old Peter Weber, a Delta Air Lines pilot from Westlake Village, California.

Weber finished in third place on the fifteenth season of The Bachelorette featuring Hannah Brown. 

The season ended on March 10, 2020, with Weber choosing to propose to 23-year-old model Hannah Ann Sluss. However, during the live After the Final Rose special, it was revealed that Weber and Sluss had ended their engagement in January 2020. Although Weber and runner-up Madison Prewett admitted to still having feelings for each other, they ultimately decided not to pursue a relationship. On May 2, 2020, Weber revealed that he was dating fifth-placed Kelley Flanagan. Weber and Flanagan announced their breakup on December 31, 2020, but got back together in August 2022.

Production

Casting and contestants
On September 17, 2019, during the reunion episode of season six of Bachelor in Paradise, Weber was announced as the next Bachelor by host Chris Harrison, over castmates Tyler Cameron and Mike Johnson.

Notable contestants include Alayah Benavidez and Victoria Paul, who competed together at Miss USA 2019 who were Miss Texas USA 2019 and Miss Louisiana USA 2019 respectively, the latter who finished in the top 15, Benavidez was also previously crowned Miss United States 2016; Miss Iowa USA 2017 and Miss USA 2017 competitor Kelsey Weier; Miss Montana Teen USA 2013 and Miss Teen USA 2013 competitor Maurissa Gunn; and Miss Tennessee USA competitor Hannah Ann Sluss. It also includes Madison Prewett, the daughter of Auburn Tigers men's basketball assistant coach and director of operations Chad Prewett.

Filming and development
On September 25, 2019, it was reported that the season would film in Cleveland, Ohio and Costa Rica. Weber suffered a minor facial injury while filming in Costa Rica. In addition to those locations, the season also included visits to Chile, Peru, and Australia.

Contestants
On September 17, 2019, 33 potential contestants were revealed on The Bachelor's social media pages. The final cast of 30 women was revealed on December 16, 2019.

Future appearances

Bachelor in Paradise
Season 7

Alayah Benavidez, Deandra Kanu, Kelsey Weier, Maurissa Gunn, Mykenna Dorn, Natasha Parker, Tammy Ly and Victoria Paul returned for season 7 of Bachelor in Paradise. Paul quit the show in week 1. Weier was eliminated in week 1. Benavidez, Kanu and Ly were eliminated in week 3. Parker was eliminated in week 5. Dorn split from Ed Waisbrot in week 6. Gunn got engaged to Riley Christian in week 6.

Season 8

Victoria Fuller returned for season 8 of Bachelor in Paradise. She got engaged to Johnny DePhillipo in week 6.

Call-out order

 The contestant received the first impression rose
 The contestant received a rose during the date
 The contestant received a rose outside of a rose ceremony or date
 The contestant was eliminated
 The contestant was eliminated outside the rose ceremony
 The contestant was eliminated during the date
 The contestant received a rose during the date but was eliminated
 The contestant quit the competition
 The contestant won the competition

Episodes

Controversy 

During week five, contestant Victoria Fuller won a group date challenge, where she was chosen to appear on the March digital cover of Cosmopolitan with Weber. Shortly after the episode that featured Fuller's win aired, Cosmopolitan editor-in-chief Jessica Pels – who appeared in the episode and selected Fuller as the winner – published an online letter which stated that the magazine would not be running the cover with Fuller, due to Fuller's involvement with a clothing brand that featured a "White Lives Matter" tagline.

In the letter, Pels stated that "unequivocally, the White Lives Matter movement does not reflect the values of the Cosmo brand," adding "we stand in solidarity with Black Lives Matter, and any cause that fights to end injustices for people of color." Fuller had previously modeled for clothing brand WLM Apparel, which uses the tagline "White Lives Matter" to promote the conservation of the white marlin. The tagline has been described by nongovernmental organizations such as the Southern Poverty Law Center as "a racist response to the civil rights movement Black Lives Matter" and "a neo-Nazi group that is growing into a movement as more and more white supremacist groups take up its slogans and tactics."

During week eight, Weber's ex-girlfriend, Merissa Pence, made an appearance to warn Peter about contestant Victoria Fuller's reputation in her hometown of Virginia Beach. News outlets have also reported on Fuller being arrested for a DUI charge back in 2017 where she was sentenced to a year in jail. The sentence was suspended, and Fuller was given 24 months of probation.

Notes

References

External links

2020 American television seasons
The Bachelor (American TV series) seasons
Television shows filmed in California
Television shows filmed in Ohio
Television shows filmed in Costa Rica
Television shows filmed in Chile
Television shows filmed in Peru
Television shows filmed in Tennessee
Television shows filmed in Iowa
Television shows filmed in Alabama
Television shows filmed in Virginia
Television shows filmed in Australia